Denton Vane (1890–September 17, 1940) was an American film actor of the silent era. He appeared in a number of films made by Vitagraph Studios.

Selected filmography

 On Her Wedding Night (1915)
 Who Killed Joe Merrion? (1915)
 The Man Who Couldn't Beat God (1915)
 The Island of Surprise (1916)
 Green Stockings (1916)
 An Enemy to the King (1916)
 The Glory of Yolanda (1917)
 The Maelstrom (1917)
 Birds of a Feather (1917)
The Grell Mystery (1917)
The Stolen Treaty (1917)
 Love Watches (1918)
 The Golden Goal (1918)
 A Girl at Bay (1919)
 The Man Who Won (1919)
 The Bramble Bush (1919)
 Wings of Pride (1920)
 Women Men Love (1921)
 Flesh and Spirit (1922)

References

Bibliography 
 Goble, Alan. The Complete Index to Literary Sources in Film. Walter de Gruyter, 1999.

External links 

 

1890 births
1940 deaths
American male film actors
People from Brooklyn